Mecklenburgische Schweiz is an Amt in the district of Rostock, in Mecklenburg-Vorpommern, Germany. The seat of the Amt is in Teterow, itself not part of the Amt.

The Amt Mecklenburgische Schweiz consists of the following municipalities:

References

Ämter in Mecklenburg-Western Pomerania
Rostock (district)